Tomás Bellas García (born 24 June 1987) is a Spanish professional basketball player for UCAM Murcia of the Liga ACB as a point guard.

Career
After playing his first professional years at LEB Bronce with Real Madrid B and Cáceres 2016, in Summer 2009 he surprisingly rescinded his contract with Cáceres for moving to Gran Canaria 2014. After complaining Cáceres this decision, Bellas was condemned to indemnify the Extremenian team with €9,400.

Bellas played in Gran Canaria during six seasons, reaching the 2015 Eurocup Finals. In Summer 2015, Bellas was invited by Atlanta Hawks to play the 2015 NBA Summer League. He later signed a three-year contract with CAI Zaragoza. On August 6, 2018, he signed a contract with Montakit Fuenlabrada Bellas signed with UCAM Murcia on October 28, 2020. He averaged 7 points and 2.8 assists per game. On June 30, 2021, Bellas re-signed with the club.

References

External links
 ACB Profile
 FEB profile
 Eurocup profile

1987 births
Living people
Baloncesto Fuenlabrada players
Basket Zaragoza players
Basketball players from Madrid
CB Gran Canaria players
CB Murcia players
Liga ACB players
Point guards
Spanish men's basketball players